Taja V. Simpson is an American actress, known for her role as Priscilla Owens in the BET prime time soap opera, The Oval.

Life and career
Simpson was born in Monroe, but raised in Lake Charles, Louisiana. She graduated from LaGrange High School and later received a degree in Mass Communications from McNeese State University. After moving to Los Angeles, she began her career appearing in episodes of television shows including Greek, NCIS: Los Angeles and Grey's Anatomy. From 2012 to 2014, Simpson had a recurring role as Adele in the CBS daytime soap opera, The Bold and the Beautiful. At that time, Simpson also appeared in a number of independent movies, and in 2017 starred in the horror-comedy film Boo 2! A Madea Halloween directed by Tyler Perry. In 2019, she played a leading role and produced the independent romantic comedy film My Online Valentine.

In 2019, Simpson began starring in the BET prime time soap opera, The Oval created by Tyler Perry. Her other television credits include NCIS, Tales, Lethal Weapon, and a recurring roles in the Urban Movie Channel soap opera A House Divided and The CW sports drama All American.

Filmography

Film

Television

References

External links

21st-century American actresses
African-American actresses
American television actresses
American soap opera actresses
Living people
Actresses from Louisiana
McNeese State University alumni
LaGrange High School (Louisiana) alumni
1978 births
21st-century African-American women
21st-century African-American people
20th-century African-American people
20th-century African-American women